"Can't Stop My Heart from Loving You" is a song written and recorded by American country music duo The O'Kanes.  It was released in January 1987 as the second single from the album The O'Kanes.  The song became The O'Kanes' second country hit and the duo's only number-one country hit. The single went to number one for one week and spent a total of 22 weeks on the country chart.

Charts

Weekly charts

Year-end charts

References

1987 singles
1986 songs
The O'Kanes songs
Songs written by Jamie O'Hara (singer)
Songs written by Kieran Kane
Columbia Records singles